Jacqueline, Baroness Fontyn (born 27 December 1930) is a contemporary Belgian composer, pianist and music educator. She was born in Antwerp, and has received the title of baroness from the King of Belgium in recognition of her many artistic contributions.

Early years
Jacqueline Fontyn was born in Antwerp, Belgium, and began piano studies at the age of five years with Ignace Bolotin. At nine years old, she began to compose small pieces, and at the age of 14, she decided to be a composer. She continued her piano studies with Marcel Maas and studied music theory and composition with Marcel Quinet in Brussels and with Max Deutsch in Paris. She also studied orchestra conducting in Vienna with Hans Swarovsky and graduated in 1959 from the Belgian Chapelle Musicale Elisabeth.

Career
Working in Antwerp, Fontyn founded a mixed choir Le Tympan and directed it for seven years. She conducted the Symphonic Orchestra of the Catholic University of Leuven in Belgium for two years.

From 1963 to 1970 she taught counterpoint at the Royal Flemish Music Conservatory in Antwerp. From 1970 to 1990 she was a professor at the Conservatory of Brussels where she taught first counterpoint and later composition. She also taught at Georgetown University, the American University in Washington, D.C., and the University of Maryland, and worked as a music teacher in Baltimore, Los Angeles, Cairo, Seoul and Tel Aviv.

Jacqueline Fontyn has received numerous honors and awards including the Prix de Rome, the Oscar Esplanada prize in 1962 in Alicante, Spain and Prix Honegger in 1988. She is a member of the Royal Academy of Sciences, Poetry and the Fine Arts of Belgium. Jacqueline Fontyn is a member of the Belgian Royal Academy and in 1993 the King of Belgium granted her the title of baroness in recognition of her artistic contributions.

Works

Orchestral works
1956 Danceries
1957 Vent d'Est for Accordion and Strings 12
1957 Mouvements Concertants for two pianos and strings
1964 Six ébauche
1965 Galaxy for chamber orchestra
1970 Colloque Quintet for Winds and Strings
1971 Per Archi for string orchestra
1972 Evoluon
1977 Quatre sites
1978 Halo for harp and 16 instruments or chamber orchestra
1979 Ephémères for mezzo-soprano and orchestra
1982 Créneaux
1983 Arachne
1988 In the green shade
1991 Colinda for Cello and Orchestra
1992 On a landscape by Turner
1996 L'anneau de jade
1998 Goeie Hoop
2000 ... it is an ocean ... for flute, harpsichord and strings
2001 Au fil des siècles
2002 A (small) Winter Night's Dream

Chamber works
1981 Mime 7 for flute or clarinet or saxophone and piano
1983 controversy for clarinet or bass clarinet or tenor saxophone and percussion
1983 Pro & Antiverb (e) s for soprano and cello
1997 battements d'ailes for Saxophone Quartet
2005 Eolus for piccolo, three flutes, alto flute and bass flute

Works for piano
1954 Capriccio
1963 Ballade
1964 Mosaici
1980 Le Gong
1980 Bulles
1982 Aura, Hommage à Brahms
2003 Diurnes
1971 spiral for two pianos
2004 hamadryads piano four hands
2005 Kobold Pianola/Phonola

Works for wind orchestra
1975 Frise for Symphonic Wind Band
Mobile e sfumato
Espressivo
Vivace
1982 Créneaux for Symphonic Wind Band
Assembly (meeting)
Contemplation (Meditation)
Faisceaux (beam)
Météores
Brouillard (fog)
Choral varié
1992 Aratoro (borrowed from the language of Maori and means "path, to be discovered") for Symphonic Wind Band with two large groups of percussion and piano
1993 Blake's mirror for mezzo-soprano and Symphonic Wind Band
The Angel
The Fly
The Tiger
Song

Other works
1986 Cheminement for soprano and eight performers

Secondary literature
Christa Brüstle (ed.), Jacqueline Fontyn – Nulla dies sine nota, Wien/London/New York: Universal Edition 2013 (Studien zur Wertungsforschung 55)

References

External links
 
 Koninklijk Conservatorium Brussel now houses most works and manuscripts of Fontyn, after the bankruptcy of CeBeDeM in 2015.
 Jacqueline Fontyn at Komponistinnen.de

1930 births
Belgian classical composers
Belgian music educators
Living people
Women classical composers
20th-century classical composers
21st-century classical composers
Belgian classical pianists
Belgian women pianists
Members of the Royal Academy of Belgium
Women classical pianists
20th-century classical pianists
21st-century classical pianists
Musicians from Antwerp
Barons of Belgium
Academic staff of the Catholic University of Leuven (1834–1968)
Academic staff of the Royal Conservatory of Brussels
Georgetown University faculty
American University faculty and staff
Prix de Rome (Belgium) winners
Belgian conductors (music)
Women conductors (music)
20th-century conductors (music)
Belgian women musicians
21st-century conductors (music)
Women music educators
20th-century women composers
21st-century women composers
20th-century women pianists
21st-century women pianists